Du Collège station is a Montreal Metro station in the borough of Saint-Laurent in Montreal, Quebec, Canada. It is operated by the Société de transport de Montréal (STM) and serves the Orange Line. It opened on January 9, 1984, and replaced Plamondon station as the western terminus of the line until Côte-Vertu station opened in 1986.

Overview 
The station is a normal side platform station with an entrance at either end. The southern entrance is located in a bus loop.

The station was designed by Gilles S. Bonnetto and Jacques Garand, and  contains several artworks. The northern entrance contains four stained-glass windows, one by Lyse Charland Favretti on the theme of education and three by Pierre Osterrath on the borough of Saint-Laurent, its agricultural past, and its future. The southern entrance contains another stained-glass window by Favretti representing the borough's aeronautics industry, as well as an abstract relief in brick by Aurelio Sandonato. The station's best-known architectural feature, however, is an Ionic column in the northern mezzanine.

In May 2018, elevators were inaugurated at the station, making it fully accessible.

Côte-Vertu metro station was closed for 12 weeks from May 29 to August 22, 2021, and Du Collège temporarily served as northwestern terminus of the Orange line.

Origin of the name
This station is named for the rue du Collège, whose name commemorates the nearby Cégep de Saint-Laurent, inaugurated as a college in 1847 and turned into a Cégep in 1968.

Connecting bus routes

With the reopening of Côte-Vertu station on August 23, 2021, the 64, 470 and 968 went back to the regular route at Côte-Vertu station. On the same day, the 76 McArthur is discontinued and the 100 Crémazie and the 460 Express Métropolitaine serve Du Collège station on the westbound and De la Savane station on the eastbound.

Nearby points of interest
Vanier College
Cégep de Saint-Laurent
Promenade de Vieux Saint-Laurent
Saint-Laurent Museum of Art
former Saint-Laurent Postal Station
former Saint-Laurent Police Station
Saint-Laurent Public Library
Saint-Laurent Municipal Courthouse
Montreal Fire Station 73
Saint-Laurent City Hall

References

External links
Du Collège Station - official web page
Du Collège metro station geo location
Montreal by Metro, metrodemontreal.com
 2013 system map
 Metro Map
 Neighbourhood map

Accessible Montreal Metro stations
Orange Line (Montreal Metro)
Railway stations in Canada opened in 1984
Saint-Laurent, Quebec